Cao Ang ( 177 – February or March 197), courtesy name Zixiu, was the eldest son of Cao Cao, a warlord who rose to power towards the end of the Han dynasty and laid the foundation of the state of Cao Wei in the Three Kingdoms period of China. He was killed at the Battle of Wancheng in 197.

Life
Cao Ang was the first son of Cao Cao and his concubine Lady Liu (劉夫人). Lady Liu also bore Cao Cao another son, Cao Shuo (曹鑠), and a daughter, Grand Princess Qinghe (清河長公主). However, as Lady Liu died early, Cao Ang was raised by Cao Cao's first official spouse, Lady Ding (丁夫人), who treated Cao Ang as though he was her real son.

Nothing was recorded in history about Cao Ang's early life, except that he was nominated as a xiaolian (civil service candidate) when he reached the age of adulthood (around 19 years old). In February or March 197, Cao Ang followed his father on a campaign against the warlord Zhang Xiu in Wan (宛; or Wancheng, in present-day Wancheng District, Nanyang, Henan). Zhang Xiu surrendered initially, but rebelled later, launched a surprise attack on Cao Cao and caught him completely off guard. Cao Cao was injured in the right arm by a stray arrow during the battle while his horse, Jueying (絕影), was hit in the neck and leg. Cao Ang could not ride on horseback so he offered his own steed to his father, who managed to escape from Wancheng. Cao Ang died in the battle.

Post-mortem events and succession

Lady Ding wept often on Cao Ang's death and accused Cao Cao of getting Cao Ang killed and not thinking of him. Cao Cao became angry and sent her back to her family in the hope she might change her mind but when he went to see her around 200, she refused to speak to him so he agreed to a divorce. After her death and when Cao Cao was unwell, he wondered how he could face Cao Ang's spirit if Ang asked about Lady Ding.

In 221, after Cao Pi (another of Cao Cao's sons) ended the Han dynasty and established the state of Cao Wei (which marked the start of the Three Kingdoms period), he granted Cao Ang the posthumous title "Duke Dao of Feng" (豐悼公). Three years later, Cao Ang was posthumously elevated to the status of a prince, so his posthumous title became "Prince Dao of Feng" (豐悼王). In 229, during the reign of Cao Pi's son Cao Rui, Cao Ang's posthumous title was changed to "Prince Min of Feng" (豐愍王).

Cao Ang had no son to succeed him when he died. However, in 222, Cao Wan (曹琬), a son of Cao Ang's half-brother, Cao Jun (曹均), was designated as Cao Ang's heir and was enfeoffed as a Zhongdu Duke (中都公). Later that year, Cao Wan was reassigned as a Zhangzi Duke (長子公). In 254, during the reign of Cao Fang, Cao Wan was promoted to "Prince of Feng" (豐王) and given the princedom "Feng", per Cao Ang's posthumous title. The number of taxable households in his princedom increased through the reigns of Cao Mao and Cao Huan until it reached 2,700. After Cao Wan died, he was posthumously honoured as "Prince Gong of Feng" (豐恭王) and was succeeded by his son, Cao Lian (曹廉).

A tomb discovered at the Cao Cao Mausoleum in Anyang which contained clothes but no human remains may belong to Cao Ang, as his body was never found.

See also
 Cao Wei family trees#Lady Liu
 Lists of people of the Three Kingdoms

Notes

References

 Chen, Shou (3rd century). Records of the Three Kingdoms (Sanguozhi).
 
 Pei, Songzhi (5th century). Annotations to Records of the Three Kingdoms (Sanguozhi zhu).
 

197 deaths
Family of Cao Cao
Year of birth uncertain
2nd-century births
Han dynasty people killed in battle
Heirs apparent who never acceded